Rothwesten is a village in the municipality Fuldatal, in the Kassel district, Hesse, Germany. It was the site of a post World War II American sector displaced person camp, and later Rothwesten Air Base.

External links
 Municipal website of Fuldatal

Villages in Hesse